Jane Sandanski Arena ( or ) is an indoor sports arena located in the Aerodrom Municipality of Skopje, Republic of Macedonia . It has a capacity of 6,000. It is named after revolutionary Jane Sandanski.

History
On 18 November 2012, it was announced that the arena would be completely demolished, with a new arena called Sports Centre Jane Sandanski planned to be built in its place. On 14 February 2013, MZT Aerodrom held their last training in Jane Sandanski, with more than a thousand fans attending. The following day the arena was officially closed and demolished.

It was rebuilt and reopened in August 2014, financed by the Russian businessman Sergey Samsonenko, built alongside the four-star hotel "Russia". In September 2015, the west and east stands were upgraded by 650 seats and south and north stands upgraded with 500 seats. Now the arena is the home ground of MZT Skopje Aerodrom, RK Vardar and WHC Vardar.

Hotel and spa 

Sandanski Arena is a super modern sports center. The sports complex includes a 5-star hotel with a spa center, swimming pool and a sky bar. Tennis courts, fitness center and clubs headquarters are within the sports complex. Sports Centre Jane Sandanski also has an aerobics center, tennis and table tennis courts, playground for children and exclusive HUMMEL sports store and fan shop.

See also
 List of indoor arenas in North Macedonia

References

External links

 Official website  in Macedonian and English

Indoor arenas in North Macedonia
Multi-purpose stadiums in North Macedonia
RK Vardar